Sailor Creek is a  long tributary of the Snake River in the U.S. state of Idaho.

See also
List of rivers of Idaho
List of longest streams of Idaho

References

Rivers of Owyhee County, Idaho
Rivers of Elmore County, Idaho
Rivers of Idaho
Tributaries of the Snake River